The Enemy Within: Saving America from the Liberal Assault on Our Schools, Faith, and Military, radio talk show host Michael Savage's nineteenth book, was published in 2003 and spent seven weeks on the New York Times best seller list, peaking at #7.

2004 non-fiction books
Books about politics of the United States
American nationalism
Books critical of modern liberalism in the United States
Books by Michael Savage